Woodside Farm and Wildfowl Park is a rare breeds farm and wildfowl park at Slip End near Luton in Central Bedfordshire.

There is also an adventure play area and 18 hole crazy golf.

External links
 Woodside Farm website

Tourist attractions in Bedfordshire
Zoos in England
Buildings and structures in Bedfordshire
Articles needing infobox zoo